Biathlon Junior World Championships were first held in 1967 for men and in 1984 for women. According to the International Biathlon Union rules, biathletes qualify as Junior if they turn 20, 21 or 22 during the season from November to October, they qualify as Youth when they turn 17, 18 or 19 during the season.

History
The first venue was Altenberg (then East Germany). The age limit of the participating athletes is 20 years. On 24 June 2009, it was decided that Nove Mesto na Moravě (Czech Republic), Lahti (Finland) and Obertilliach (Austria) will be the venues for the World Junior Championships in 2011, 2012 and 2013.

The Biathlon Junior World Championships from 1967 to 1988 were held in the same period and in one venue as the World Championships.

Editions
Junior and youth competitions were held at the following locations:

 1967:  Altenberg
 1968:  Luleå
 1969:  Zakopane
 1970:  Östersund
 1971:  Hämeenlinna
 1972:  Linthal
 1973:  Lake Placid
 1974:  Minsk
 1975:  Antholz
 1976:  Minsk
 1977:  Lillehammer
 1978:  Hochfilzen
 1979:  Ruhpolding
 1980:  Sarajevo
 1981:  Lahti
 1982:  Minsk
 1983:  Antholz
 1984:  Chamonix
 1985:  Egg am Etzel
 1986:  Falun
 1987:  Lahti
 1988:  Chamonix
 1989:  Voss
 1990:  Sodankylä
 1991:  Galyatető
 1992:  Canmore
 1993:  Ruhpolding
 1994:  Osrblie
 1995:  Andermatt
 1996:  Kontiolahti
 1997:  Forni Avoltri
 1998:  Valcartier
 1999:  Pokljuka
 2000:  Hochfilzen
 2001:  Khanty-Mansiysk
 2002:  Ridnaun
 2003:  Kościelisko
 2004:  Haute Maurienne Vanoise
 2005:  Kontiolahti
 2006:  Presque Isle
 2007:  Martell
 2008:  Ruhpolding
 2009:  Canmore, Alberta
 2010:  Torsby
 2011:  Nové Město na Moravě
 2012:  Kontiolahti
 2013:  Obertilliach
 2014:   Presque Isle
 2015:  Minsk
 2016:  Cheile Grădiştei
 2017:  Osrblie
 2018:  Otepää
 2019:  Osrblie
 2020:  Lenzerheide
 2021:  Obertilliach
 2022:  Soldier Hollow
 2023:  Schuchinsk
 2024:  Otepää
 2025:  Östersund
 2026:  Arber

Sources:

Winners (junior events)

Winners (youth events)

Medal table 
As of 2022.

 Germany including East Germany & West Germany medals
 Russia including USSR medals
 Czech Republic including Czechoslovakia medals

See also
 Biathlon World Championships
 IBU Junior Cup

References

External links
 IBU Results

 
Junior
World youth sports competitions
Recurring sporting events established in 1967